Transformers: King Grimlock is an American comic book limited series written by Steve Orlando, drawn by Agustin Padilla, colored by Jeremy Colwell and Heather Breckel, and published by IDW Publishing. Based on the Transformers franchise by Hasbro and Takara-Tomy, the series features Grimlock as the main character.

The series debuted on August 4, 2021, and concluded on February 2, 2022.

Premise 
During a mission, Dinobot Grimlock is accidentally transported to the magical planet Menonia, but takes the opportunity to become the strongest. After meeting a human named Arko, Grimlock reluctantly joins forces with her to save her planet from a despot.

Publication history 
In May 2021, IDW Publishing announced a comic book limited series titled Transformers: King Grimlock, written Steve Orlando, drawn by Agustin Padilla, colored by Jeremy Colwell, and set to be published in August 2021.

Orlando said the series "is a sky-high dream come to life. This is a first-of-its-kind, science/fantasy epic for fans new and old, whether you follow the animation of the '80s, the modern shows of the '00s, the big-screen blockbusters, the decades of incredible comics, or if you've been intrigued by Grimlock action figures on the shelf. Everyone's welcome!"

IDW editor David Mariotte said, "by spotlighting a beloved character like Grimlock in an epic barbarian fantasy, Steve, Agustin, and Jeremy are crafting an iconic story that expands the understanding of who Grimlock is and what a Transformers story can be. Plus, a two-story tall robotic T-rex battles dragons, magicians, and monsters, which is awesome."

Issues

Reception

Collected edition

References 

Comics based on Hasbro toys
King Grimlock